Aćim is a Serbian masculine given name, a variant of Akim, adopted from Biblical (Hebrew) name Joachim meaning "God erects". It is attested in Serbian society since the Middle Ages. The patronymic surname Aćimović is derived from the name. It may refer to:

Aćim Doljanac ( 1804–06), Serbian Revolutionary
 (1815–1893), Serbian physician
Aćim Čumić (1836–1901), Serbian professor of law, judge, President of Government (1874–75)
 (1894–1944), Bosnian Serb Chetnik
 (1898–1948), Yugoslav Partisan

References

Sources
 

Serbian masculine given names